World Wildlife Fund Canada (WWF-Canada) is one of Canada's largest conservation organizations and is a member of the WWF global network, actively contributing to the protection, management, and restoration of the environment. The WWF's name remains World Wildlife Fund in Canada and the United States, but it is known as World Wide Fund for Nature around the world. The organization works to protect Canada's endangered species, promote sustainable ocean and fresh water management, and develop strategies for renewable energy development.

Mission statement 
On its official website, the organization's mission is:To stop the degradation of the planet's natural environment and to build a future in which humans live in harmony with nature, by: 
 conserving the world's biological diversity,
 ensuring that the use of renewable natural resources is sustainable,
 promoting the reduction of pollution and wasteful consumption.

Offices 
 Toronto, Ontario (head office)
 Ottawa, Ontario
 Victoria, British Columbia
 Halifax, Nova Scotia
 St. John's, Newfoundland and Labrador
 Montreal, Quebec
 Iqaluit, Nunavut

See also 
Ernie Cooper
List of ecoregions in Canada (WWF)

References

External links 
 WWF-Canada Website
 WWF Global Network
 WWF International Website

Canada
Environmental organizations based in Ontario
Organizations based in Toronto
Environmental organizations established in 1967
1967 establishments in Ontario